Johanna Päts (17 December 1890 Tallinn – 13 November 1977 Toronto) was an Estonian politician. She was a member of Estonian Constituent Assembly.

References

1890 births
1977 deaths
Members of the Estonian Constituent Assembly